Sahitya Akademi Translation Prize or Sahitya Akademi Prize for Translation is a literary honour in India, presented by Sahitya Akademi, India's National Academy of Letters, given to "outstanding translations of creative and critical works" in 24 major Indian languages such as English, Rajasthani, Punjabi and the 22 listed languages in the Eighth Schedule of the Indian Constitution recognised by the Sahitya Akademi, New Delhi.

The award, established in 1989, comprises a plaque and a cash prize of ₹ 50,000. Krishnamohan was the youngest translator to win the prize at age of 32 in Hindi and Kalachand Shastri is the oldest to win the prize at age of 89 in Manipuri.

Background 
Awards for translations were instituted in 1989 at the instance of then-Prime Minister of India, P. V. Narasimha Rao. The initial proposal for translation prizes contained provisions for a prize for translations into each of the twenty-two languages recognised by the Akademi; however, this was soon found to be unviable for several reasons: Akademi found insufficient entries in all the languages and difficulties in locating experts knowledgeable in both, the source and the target language to judge the translations. Consequently, the Board decided to dispense with its original requirement for additional expert committees to evaluate the translations, and also ruled that it was not obligated to grant prizes in languages where suitable books were not nominated. The Akademi also requires that both, the original author as well as the translator, are to be Indian nationals.

Over time, the Akademi has modified and expanded the conditions for the Translation Prizes. In 1992, the Akademi began to allow translations made in link languages to be eligible for the Awards, although it noted that translations made directly from the original language would always be preferred. In 1995, the Akademi also held that joint translations would be eligible, and in 1997, it dispensed with the process of advertising for nominations and replaced it with invitations for recommendations from advisory boards and Committee members. As of 2002, 264 prizes have been awarded to 266 translators.

Initially, the prize money was 10,000 which was increased to 15,000 in 2001. From 2003 it was increased to 20,000 and is now Rs.50,000 from 2009.

Rules and selection process 
Entries for the prizes are invited from individual translator or publishers through advertise in newspapers. Members of the advisory boards are also invited to send nominations from the different languages. Minimum five entries from each language are mandatory for a prize to be awarded. Expert committee for each language consist of three members scrutinise all the nominations and send the copy of shortlisted books to the expert who knows both the source and the target languages. Opinion of the expert forwarded to the executive board and board will consider the recommendation and award the prizes.

The executive board members and the prior winners are not entitle for the award. Translations from the original languages are preferred than link languages. joint venture is also eligible however award amount equally divided between the translators.

Recipients 
 List of Sahitya Akademi Translation Prize winners for Assamese
 List of Sahitya Akademi Translation Prize winners for Bengali
 List of Sahitya Akademi Translation Prize winners for Bodo
 List of Sahitya Akademi Translation Prize winners for Dogri
 List of Sahitya Akademi Translation Prize winners for English
 List of Sahitya Akademi Translation Prize winners for Gujarati
 List of Sahitya Akademi Translation Prize winners for Hindi
 List of Sahitya Akademi Translation Prize winners for Kannada
 List of Sahitya Akademi Translation Prize winners for Kashmiri
 List of Sahitya Akademi Translation Prize winners for Konkani
 List of Sahitya Akademi Translation Prize winners for Maithili
 List of Sahitya Akademi Translation Prize winners for Malayalam
 List of Sahitya Akademi Translation Prize winners for Manipuri
 List of Sahitya Akademi Translation Prize winners for Marathi
 List of Sahitya Akademi Translation Prize winners for Nepali
 List of Sahitya Akademi Translation Prize winners for Odia
 List of Sahitya Akademi Translation Prize winners for Punjabi
 List of Sahitya Akademi Translation Prize winners for Rajasthani
 List of Sahitya Akademi Translation Prize winners for Sanskrit
 List of Sahitya Akademi Translation Prize winners for Santali
 List of Sahitya Akademi Translation Prize winners for Sindhi
 List of Sahitya Akademi Translation Prize winners for Tamil
 List of Sahitya Akademi Translation Prize winners for Telugu
 List of Sahitya Akademi Translation Prize winners for Urdu

See also 
 Sahitya Akademi Award
 List of literary awards

References

Sahitya Akademi Prize for Translation
Indian literary awards
Awards established in 1989
Translation awards